Route 140 is a  state highway in Carneys Point Township, Salem County, New Jersey, United States. It is a short east–west connector in Deepwater between U.S. Route 130 (US 130; Shell Road) and both the New Jersey Turnpike and U.S. Route 40 (Wiley Road) in Carneys Point near the Delaware Memorial Bridge.  It is completely concurrent with County Route 540 (CR 540). Because of its close proximity to these major arteries (as well as Interstate 295 or I-295), there are numerous truck stops, motels, and diners along this highway, despite its short  length. Also, the main entrance to the DuPont Chamber Works facility is located at the end on US Route 130.

Route description

Route 140 begins at U.S. Route 130 in the community of Deepwater, New Jersey. The route heads eastward as Hawks Bridge Road, passing through forestry east of the DuPont riverside factory. The large portion of forestry breaks up into a large clearing. In this large clearing, Route 140 passes between two truck stops. The route continues, intersecting with the on-ramps to Interstate 295. Route 140 then crosses over the interstate and settles back on land. From there, Route 140 crosses to the north of another truck stop and intersects with County Route 551 (South Pennsville-Auburn Road). Intersecting with local off-ramps, the route crosses by some businesses before interchanging with the New Jersey Turnpike and U.S. Route 40. The route continues a short distance after the interchange, terminating at Wiley Road, where it continues as County Route 540.

History
Route 140 was first legislated by the New Jersey State Legislature in 1973 as a state highway from U.S. Route 130 to U.S. Route 40. The eastern two-thirds was state-maintained because of the Interstate 295 and the New Jersey Turnpike interchanges. The route remained unnumbered however. In 1977, the western third (U.S. Route 130 to Interstate 295) was taken over by the state and the route was designated Route 140 and has remained the same since the legislation.

Major intersections

See also

References

External links

 Speed Limits for State Roads: Route 140

140
Transportation in Salem County, New Jersey
State highways in the United States shorter than one mile